Marina Iosifovna Gershenovich (born September 28, 1960) is a Russian poet and translator born in the city of Novosibirsk, Soviet Union, who resides in Düsseldorf, Germany.

Bibliography 

Razgovory na rasput’e (1995)
V poiskah angela (2002)
Kniga na četveryh (2005)
Mascha Kaleko: Žizn’ i stihi (2007)

References

External links
Marina Gershenovich 
Her site at bards.ru
Concert by Marina Gershenovich, together with Vera Evushkina and Elena Frolova, 18 May 1997, Moscow

Russian translators
1960 births
Living people
Writers from Novosibirsk
Russian emigrants to Germany
Russian women poets